James Reinard Wilson (born December 17, 1973) is an American former professional football player who was a linebacker in the National Football League (NFL) for six seasons during the late 1990s and early 2000s.  He played college football for the Florida State Seminoles and was recognized as an All-American.  He was picked by the Cincinnati Bengals in the first round of the 1997 NFL Draft, and played professionally for the Bengals and Tampa Bay Buccaneers of the NFL.

Early years
Wilson was born in Gainesville, Florida.  He attended Columbia High School in Lake City, Florida, where he was a standout high school football player for the Columbia Tigers.

College career
Wilson received an athletic scholarship to attend Florida State University, where he played for coach Bobby Bowden's Seminoles teams from 1993 to 1996.  As a senior in 1996, he was recognized as a consensus first-team All-American after recording thirteen sacks in his final college season.

Professional career
In six NFL seasons, he appeared in 93 regular season games, started 23 of them, and compiled 173 tackles and 24 quarterback sacks.

NFL statistics

References

1973 births
Living people
All-American college football players
American football defensive ends
American football linebackers
Cincinnati Bengals players
Florida State Seminoles football players
Tampa Bay Buccaneers players